VV DESK is a football club from Kaatsheuvel, Netherlands. DESK plays in the Sunday Eerste Klasse (5th tier) in the 2013–14 season, after being eliminated from promotion play-offs the foregoing season.

DESK won the national KNVB Amateur Cup for Sunday clubs in 1980.

References

External links
 Official site

Football clubs in the Netherlands
Football clubs in North Brabant
1930 establishments in the Netherlands
Association football clubs established in 1930
Sport in Loon op Zand